Horace Evans may refer to:
 Horace Evans, 1st Baron Evans, Welsh physician
 Sir Horace Moule Evans, Indian Army officer